Michel-Jean-André Chesneau (29 September 1757 – 25 July 1832) was a French Navy officer, commander of the frigate Rhin during the Battle of Trafalgar.

Biography 
Chesneau was born in Rouen. He started sailing in the merchant navy in 1770. In 1778, he joined the French Royal navy as a pilot.

Returned to merchantmen in 1783, he joined the Navy again in 1793 with the rank of lieutenant.

He captained the frigate Rhin during the Battle of Trafalgar.

He died in Brest.

References

1757 births
1832 deaths
Military personnel from Rouen
French naval commanders of the Napoleonic Wars